The Great Man is a 1956 American film noir drama film directed by and starring José Ferrer. The screenplay was written by Ferrer and Al Morgan, Morgan's novel of the same name the source material. It was loosely based on the controversial career of Arthur Godfrey, a beloved TV and radio host whose image had been tarnished by a number of cast firings and Godfrey's contentious battles with the press.

Plot
Joe Harris (José Ferrer) is a popular, established local radio news reporter covering Broadway entertainment with a wise-guy attitude. Herb Fuller is the network's undisputed star. When Fuller dies in an auto accident, Philip Carleton (Dean Jagger), president of the Amalgamated Broadcasting Network, assigns Harris to prepare a memorial extravaganza, including an elaborate public viewing and a special memorial show featuring interviews with Fuller's radio cast, the "Fuller Family" (based on Arthur Godfrey's cast of "Little Godfreys"), and others who knew him. Carleton dangles a chance at Harris becoming Fuller's replacement if he succeeds.

Assisted by network PR man Nick Cellentano (Jim Backus), Harris is intrigued by odd comments at the public viewing, including some from various individuals who attend strictly out of boredom and are indifferent to Fuller.

Harris meets Sid Moore (Keenan Wynn), Fuller's longtime producer, who offers his assistance while realizing Harris is in line to become Fuller's successor. Aided by his secretary Ginny (Joanne Gilbert), Harris discovers Fuller was an alcoholic and an unethical womanizing egomaniac who became a star in spite of it. He is visited by Paul Beaseley (Ed Wynn), owner of a tiny Christian radio station in New England, who first hired Fuller, impressed by his inspirational poetry, and treated him as a son, only to discover Fuller's dark side. Harris is initially condescending to the mild-mannered Beaseley, but by the time he finishes his story, Harris is apologetic.

Harris's investigations reveal Fuller's relationship with Carol Larson (Julie London), the alcoholic vocalist on his show, and various conflicts of interest involving his relationship with various song publishers whose songs were performed on Fuller's program. Fuller bandleader Eddie Brand (played by real-life bandleader Russ Morgan), hoping to remain on what he, too, suspects will become Harris's show, dutifully records an artificially sincere sound bite regarding Fuller.

Moore signs Harris to a contract, then reveals more of Fuller's escapades. Carleton privately warns Harris of Moore's duplicitous nature, telling the newsman that the network will spin his chances of becoming Fuller's successor negatively so that Moore agrees to release him from the contract, adding that if Harris cannot secure a release, the network will turn elsewhere. Amassing the research into a script, Harris has to choose between praising the beloved, amusing and warm-hearted Fuller the public saw or unmasking the phony beneath the image.

Harris makes up his mind as the broadcast starts, throwing away his prepared script to tell the truth about Herb Fuller. As Carleton and Moore listen in, Moore realizes what Harris is about to do. He rips up Harris's contract and demands that Carleton stop the broadcast. Seeing that Moore has done precisely what he had hoped for, Carleton refuses to stop the broadcast, explaining that he can market Harris as a man of principle and honesty to the public just as easily as his network marketed Fuller's phony image.

Background
While the movie was based on the controversy surrounding Arthur Godfrey, whose tabloid real-life persona contrasted with his warm-hearted public demeanor, the fictional Fuller's failings differed greatly. Godfrey's controversies were mostly public, not private. His early years in broadcasting in Baltimore, Washington DC and New York City were largely noncontroversial, marked mainly by favorable public reaction to his informality on the air and his extemporized, irreverent commercials. The term "the Fuller Family" used in the film was based on the umbrella term "Little Godfreys" applied to his cast.  Godfrey's womanizing was long-rumored but never confirmed, and he was not a heavy drinker like Fuller. While Fuller was depicted as carrying blood to wounded soldiers overseas, a manufactured episode when he was too drunk to do his job, Godfrey remained stateside during World War II, doing his shows and carrying out his duties as a Naval Reserve officer around Washington.  He subsequently earned the rank of Commander, in part because of his vocal support for the Navy, particularly Naval aviation, on his programs. Godfrey's reputation for bullying members of his cast offstage was one exception.  That situation,  originally private, only became public with the October 19, 1953 on air firing of singer, and popular Godfrey show discovery, Julius LaRosa. After a minor backstage dispute with Godfrey, LaRosa violated an unwritten rule against Godfrey show regulars hiring personal management, despite the fact their contracts contained no such prohibition..  Given Godfrey's popularity, the incident became a national scandal at the time, made worse when Godfrey explained the firing by declaring LaRosa had "lost his humility," precipitating a public backlash against Godfrey himself. For a time, LaRosa saw his career flourish as daily negative press against his former employer grew, though his popularity eventually leveled off. Godfrey was also known to relish confrontations with CBS network executives, including network Chairman William S. Paley, criticizing them on the air, aware the high profits from commercial time on his three television and radio programs gave him the upper hand.  Unlike Fuller, Godfrey did not die suddenly. He survived 1959 lung cancer surgery despite losing part of a lung and remained on CBS radio until 1972. He died in 1983 at age 79 of emphysema.  At the time of the film's release, Godfrey was still highly controversial. Part of the controversy involved his subsequent firings of various "Little Godfreys."  1955 accusations of anti-Semitism that grew out of Godfrey's part-ownership of a Miami Beach hotel notorious for refusing to accommodate Jews also dogged him, though few believed the charges.  Godfrey insisted he had ended that policy when he became one of the owners.

Cast
 José Ferrer as Joe Harris
 Dean Jagger as Philip Carleton
 Keenan Wynn as Sid Moore
 Jim Backus as Nick Cellantano
 Julie London as Carol Larson
 Ed Wynn as Paul Beaseley
 Russ Morgan as Eddie Brand
 Joanne Gilbert as Ginny, Harris's secretary
 Barrie Chase as Sexy Secretary (uncredited)
 Edward Platt as Dr. O’Connor (as Edward C. Platt)
 Robert Foulk as Mike Jack, a radio engineer
 Lyle Talbot as Harry Connors
 Vinton Hayworth as Charley Carruthers
 Henny Backus as Mrs. Rieber
 Janie Alexander as Mary Browne
 Vikki Dougan as Marica, new receptionist
 Robert Schwartz as Mailboy

Rest of cast listed alphabetically:
 Dorothy Abbott as ‘American Airlines’ Stewardess (uncredited)
 Herbert Baker as Elevator Operator (uncredited)
 Eddie Gomez as Proprietor (uncredited)
 Johnny Grant as Disc Jockey (uncredited)
 Hallene Hill as Old Woman (uncredited)
 Jane Howard as Secretary (uncredited)
 Adrienne Marden as Voice of Mrs. Fuller (uncredited)
 Coleen McClatchey as Secretary (uncredited)
 Albert E. Morgan as Voice of Herb Fuller (uncredited)
 Steve Pendelton as Voice of Director (uncredited)
 Gail Stone as Mary’s Sister (uncredited)

See also
 List of American films of 1956
 A Face in the Crowd

References

External links
 
 
 
 

1956 films
1956 drama films
American drama films
American satirical films
American black-and-white films
1950s English-language films
Films about radio people
Films based on American novels
Films directed by José Ferrer
Films scored by Herman Stein
Films set in New York City
Universal Pictures films
1950s American films
Arthur Godfrey